Alert on LAN (AOL, sometimes AoL) is a 1998, IBM- and Intel-developed technology that allows for remote management and control of networked PCs. AOL requires a Wake on LAN adapter.

Technical details 

The main idea of AOL is to send warnings to remote administrators about different PC conditions using a LAN. These conditions include: 

 System unplugged from power source
 System unplugged from network
 Chassis intrusion
 Processor removal
 System environmental errors
 High temperature
 Fan speed
 Voltage fluctuations
 Operating system errors
 System power-on errors
 System is hung
 Component failure

Alert on LAN 2 (AOL2) extends AOL to allow active PC management, including:

 Remote system reboot upon report of a critical failure 
 Repair Operating System 
 Update BIOS image 
 Perform other diagnostic procedures

See also 
 Wake-on-LAN
 Alert Standard Format
 Desktop and mobile Architecture for System Hardware

Additional resources 
 AOL Introduction from IBM

Remote control